Virtually Heroes is a 2013 American low-budget gamer film directed by G.J. Echternkamp and starring Robert Baker and Mark Hamill. Produced by Roger Corman, it made its world premiere at the 2013 Sundance Film Festival.

Plot 
Two self-aware characters in a Call of Duty-inspired video game battle endless supplies of Vietcong, absurdly powerful level bosses and their own existential crises. With the help of Mark Hamill's Yoda-like monk, they attempt to win the game and get the girl.

Production 
Virtually Heroes evolved from Roger Corman's desire to utilize his extensive library of stock footage to create a modern war film. Since the 1970s, Corman produced over 20 war films with Filipino director Cirio H. Santiago. Writers G.J. Echternkamp and Matt Yamashita drew heavily on Corman's library to write their script, developing a video game world to justify the repurposed stock footage.

"I thought if I could find a way to use the big battle scenes from all of these pictures and put it together in a new picture and shoot just a short period of time to tie them all together, I could get a big-looking picture for very little money," Corman said in an interview.

Because of the shoestring-budget, most of the film had to be block-shot. Most of the takes were done only twice.

Release
Virtually Heroes was Roger Corman's first submission to enter the Sundance Film Festival. It remained unavailable for nearly a decade until Screen Media announced that it had acquired the film for release on August 19, 2022, and would give the film a limited theatrical and digital release in December 2022, followed by a release on the Crackle Plus platform Popcornflix.

Films featured 
Virtually Heroes uses footage from the following Corman pictures:
  Battle Gear (1991)
  Beyond the Call of Duty (1992)
  Eye of the Eagle (1987)
  Eye of the Eagle 2: Inside the Enemy (1989)
  Eye of the Eagle 3: Last Stand at Lang Mei (1989)
  Firehawk (1993)
  Kill Zone (1993)
 Saigon Commandos (1988)
 When Eagles Strike (2003)

References

External links 
 
 Virtually Heroes Official Website

Films about video games
2013 films
Films produced by Roger Corman
2010s English-language films